The 34th United States Colored Infantry was a U.S.C.T. infantry regiment in the Union Army during the American Civil War. It was re-organized from the 2nd South Carolina Infantry (African Descent) in February 1864. It was assigned to various posts in Florida and South Carolina, and took part in the Battle of Honey Hill in November 1864. It was mustered out on February 28, 1866.

One officer, George W. Brush, was awarded the Medal of Honor for leading a rescue operation on the Ashepoo River.

Commanding Officers
Col. William Warren Marple

See also
List of United States Colored Troops Civil War units

Sources
 South Carolina Civil War soldiers

United States Colored Troops Civil War units and formations
Units and formations of the Union Army from South Carolina
1864 establishments in South Carolina
Military units and formations established in 1864
Military units and formations disestablished in 1866